Etiella walsinghamella is a species of snout moth in the genus Etiella. It was described by Émile Louis Ragonot in 1888. It is found from Australia (Queensland) to New Guinea and Japan.

References

Moths described in 1888
Phycitini
Moths of Japan